Leptodactylus pascoensis is a species of frog in the family Leptodactylidae. It is endemic to Peru where it is only known from two localities ((Chontilla, Pasco, and Serrania de Sira, Huánuco)). It is an inhabitant of forest floor of the Amazonian flanks of the Andes. Reproduction takes place in foam nests in temporary ponds.

Leptodactylus pascoensis is not an uncommon species but its range is small and it suffers from habitat loss caused by increased agricultural activity.

References

pascoensis
Amphibians of Peru
Endemic fauna of Peru
Amphibians described in 1994
Taxonomy articles created by Polbot